Dolgany is a rural locality (a village) in Levinskoye Rural Settlement, Bolshesosnovsky District, Perm Krai, Russia. The population was 7 as of 2010.

Geography 
It is located 6.5 km south-east from Levino.

References 

Rural localities in Bolshesosnovsky District